Meltem Cumbul (born 5 November 1969) is a Turkish actress and TV personality.

Biography 

Meltem Cumbul's career encompasses 16 feature films including Berlinale Golden Bear winner Head-On movie, 6 TV serials including 
Yılan Hikayesi, at one time the most successful and the most viewed TV series in Turkey, as well as plays and musicals including Smokey Joe's Cafe and Taming of the Shrew. She has played the role of Fatma Sultan in the historical drama Muhteşem Yüzyıl.

She has also received awards from and participated on juries at many national and international awards at the festivals like Palm Springs, Queens, Ankara, and Antalya Golden Orange Film Festivals. Currently, Meltem Cumbul is teaching the acting method of Eric Morris, whom she studied with in Los Angeles for 3 years starting in 2005, at the Mimiar Sinan State Conservatory where she graduated from.

Credits

Talk shows 
 1993 Rifle King Kong Show, Kanal 6
 1994 Nereden Başlasak Nasıl Anlatsak, Kanal D
 1995 Kolaysa Sen de Gel, ATV
 1997 Meltem Cumbul Show, Kanal 6

Music 
 1999 "Seninleyim" (single) (NR1 Müzik)

See also
 List of Eurovision Song Contest presenters

Notes

References 
 Biyografi.info – Biography of Meltem Cumbul

External links 
 Personal website
 

1969 births
Actresses from İzmir
Turkish people of Circassian descent
Living people
Turkish film actresses
Best Actress Golden Orange Award winners
20th-century Turkish actresses